North Fork Piney River is a tributary of the Piney River in Eagle County, Colorado.  The river flows southwest from a source on the west flank of Elliott Ridge in the White River National Forest to a confluence with the Piney River.

See also
 List of rivers of Colorado
 List of tributaries of the Colorado River

References

Rivers of Colorado
Rivers of Eagle County, Colorado
Tributaries of the Colorado River in Colorado